Shelly Omílàdé Bell (known as Omi) is an American entrepreneur and startup ecosystem builder. She is the founder and CEO of the social enterprise "Black Girl Ventures".

Early life
Bell was born in Durham, North Carolina. After receiving a B.S. in Computer Science from North Carolina Agricultural and Technical State University, Bell began her career as a K-12 teacher.

Career
Bell founded MsPrint USA, a women-run custom apparel and merchandise print shop, who served clients like Amazon and Google.

She also hosted poetry performances and led a community-based arts organization called Seven City Art Society, which evolved into Made By a Black Woman, a marketplace offering clothing, accessories, and home decor created and curated by women of color.

In 2016, Bell founded Black Girl Vision, which started as a meetup group of 30 women before Bell rebranded the organization as Black Girl Ventures. Bell aimed to connect women founders of color to peers, investors, advisors, and mentors, while garnering support and resources from corporations and local government. She has cited the lack of visibility and opportunities for Black women founders as one of her primary motivations for launching Black Girl Ventures. The organization runs an annual pitch competition. Its funding sources include crowdfunding, the Knight Foundation, the Kauffman Foundation, and Google.

Personal life
Bell is based in Washington, D.C. 

She identifies as bisexual. As an advocate for the LGBTQIA community, she is committed to creating inclusive spaces for people of all gender identities and sexual orientations.

References 

Year of birth missing (living people)
Living people
American women business executives
American LGBT businesspeople
People from Durham, North Carolina
North Carolina A&T State University alumni
21st-century American women